Aiguebelette-le-Lac is a commune and village in the Savoie department in the Auvergne-Rhône-Alpes region in south-eastern France. In 2016, it had a population of 249 people. It is named after and lies near the southeastern shore of Lac d'Aiguebelette, one of the largest natural lakes of France. Le Port is a small port on the lake, with a beach. The commune contains the  Château d'Aiguebelette, a medieval structure which is in a ruinous state, while the main church in the area, dedicated to Saint Andrew, was restored in 1854.

History
During the period of occupation of the Duchy of Savoy by the French revolutionary troops, following the annexation of 1792, the commune belonged to the canton of Le Pont-de-Beauvoisin, in the Mont Blanc Department.

During the Second World War. Aiguebelette-le-Lac, located in an unoccupied zone, was the scene of a significant event with the house arrest of many foreign Jewish families living in  hotels at the time. On August 26, 1942 these families underwent a roundup organized by the French police under the orders of the government of Vichy. Many of them were deported and murdered in Auschwitz. The neighboring municipalities of Lépin-le-Lac and Saint-Alban-de-Montbel were also affected by this policy of regrouping foreign Jews to deport them.

Geography

The village of Aiguebelette-le-Lac lies near the southeastern shore of Lac d'Aiguebelette. There is a port and beach on the lake to the north of the town on the shore at Le Port.
The commune contains the hamlets of  Les Allamans, Les Cambet, La Combe, La Girardière, Le Noyau, Les Prés, Le Port, Les Gustin, Le Bourg, Le Boyat, Côte-Épine, Les Combettes, Le Cugnet, Les Culées, Le Fayet, Malacôte, Le Sauget and Le Platon.

Landmarks

There are the remains of a fortified village in the vicinity, with the door to an old medieval enclosure. There are also prehistoric pile-dwelling (or stilt house) settlements that are part of the Prehistoric Pile dwellings around the Alps UNESCO World Heritage Site. The Château d'Aiguebelette is in a ruinous state. In 1317 it was mentioned in an act passed by Dauphin. The main church in the area is dedicated to Saint Andrew (Saint André). It was restored in 1854.

Transport
The D9210 road passes through passes through Aiguebelette-le-Lac and skirts the eastern shore of the lake, leading to Autoroute A43. The commune is served by the railway station Gare d'Aiguebelette-le-Lac, on the TER Auvergne-Rhône-Alpes line. The nearest airport is at Chambéry Airport.

See also
Communes of the Savoie department

References

External links

Communes of Savoie